Bachelor's buttons is a common name for several plant species:
 Gomphrena canescens, native to Australia.
 Gomphrena globosa, native to Brazil, Panama and Guatemala.
 Centaurea cyanus, native to Europe, including the British Isles and cultivated as an annual ornamental plant.
 Centaurea montana, native to Europe, excluding the British Isles, and cultivated as a perennial ornamental plant.
 Kerria japonica 'Pleniflora', a double-flowered cultivar of a species native to China, Japan and Korea.
 Ranunculus aconitifolius, native to central Europe.